Orthodox Experience is a studio album of the Slovak band Lavagance. In November 2007, the album was recorded in the Lavagance studio and released under the Lavagance label.

Track listing
 Orthodox Experience
 Like a Butterfly
 Vision
 Cruel Games
 I Like This Temper
 Purification
 Small Town Melody
 Albino Planet
 I Had a Dream
 Wish to Leave
 Pure Pioneer

Reception
In January 2008, the album Orthodox Experience was voted Best Slovak Album of 2007 by Rádio FM. listeners. In spring 2008, Lavagance toured in support of the album, appearing in 10 Slovak cities.

Personnel
 Marek Rakovický - vocals, guitar, programming, keyboards
 Vincent Susol - bass guitar, vocals
 Viliam Bujnovský - keyboards, programming
 Marek Gregor - drums, vocals, programming
 Mario Smashing - guitar, vocals, keyboards
 Peter Rakovický - keyboards, programming & sound engineering

References

External links
 Official Lavagance website: lavagance.com

2007 albums
Lavagance albums